Catherine Clark Kroeger (December 12, 1925 – February 14, 2011) was an American writer, professor, New Testament scholar, and a leading figure within the biblical egalitarian movement. She founded the worldwide organization Christians for Biblical Equality (CBE), and its papers are housed at her family home. As a speaker, Kroeger traveled the globe opposing violence and the abuse of women, while also advancing the biblical basis for the shared leadership and authority of males and females.

Born Catherine Clark, daughter of Homer and Elizabeth Clark, in St. Paul, Minnesota, she graduated from Bryn Mawr College in 1947. Then she earned an MA and a PhD in Classical Studies from the University of Minnesota. She was married to her husband of 60 years, Richard Clark Kroeger Jr., a Presbyterian pastor. They served together in ten pastorates in five states. In their latter years they resided on Cape Cod in Brewster, Massachusetts. Richard Clark Kroeger Jr. died 9 November 2010, Catherine Clark Kroeger on 14 February 2011.

Leadership
Besides having founded Christians for Biblical Equality, she established Peace and Safety in the Christian Home (PASCH) and served as its founding president. After rearing five children, she served in leadership roles in many other organizations, serving on the Board of Trustees at Trinity Christian Academy and the Latham Center on Cape Cod, Massachusetts, and at Whitworth College in Spokane, Washington. She held membership in the American Academy of Religion, The Society of Biblical Literature, and the Evangelical Theological Society. She was an active layperson in the Presbyterian Church USA. She was cited in Helen Kooiman Hosier's 100 Christian Women Who Changed the 20th Century, and received an honorary Doctorate in Humane Letters from Houghton College in 2004. She held memberships in the American Academy of Religion, the Society of Biblical Literature and the Evangelical Theological Society. For a quarter of a century she maintained strong links with scholars in the UK, collaborating with Elaine Storkey and Mary Evans, and was much sought-after as a speaker at British conventions.

Teaching
Kroeger's scholarly interests included women in ancient religion, human sexuality and biblical mandate, women of the Bible, women in the early church, Africans in the Bible and early church, Christian response to domestic abuse and the social world of the early church. She led many study tours into ancient world locations that still contain evidence of the active role of women in the early church. These included explorations of the catacombs, edifices, stone inscriptions, and  other relics which she saw as evidence that in the early post-Resurrection era, the Christian church's respect and trust for women far exceeded their ecclesiastical status in later centuries, including the present.

Beginning in 1990, Kroeger became a ranked adjunct professor of classical and ministry studies at Gordon Conwell Theological Seminary where she taught courses and mentored students and candidates for graduate degrees. She also served as Protestant chaplain and lecturer in the Department of Religion at Hamilton College.

Theological view on gender equality
Kroeger was well known as a conservative Christian who held a high view of the Bible as being divinely-inspired. Unlike many others who ignored or wrote off the so-called "difficult" passages of the Bible as being translation errors, scribal glosses, or other textual changes to the original, Kroeger went to great efforts to discern the original intent of the passage's author. This commitment, combined with her extensive classical studies research, led her to a highly detailed cultural and historical analysis to propose what was the real intent of the author of such passages.

A primary example of this paradigm permeates the book, I Suffer Not a Woman: Rethinking 1 Timothy 2:11-15 in Light of Ancient Evidence, which she coauthored with her husband. The verse this book takes on is one of the best known in Scripture regarding gender and one of the most difficult for most churches today in general. Most of the restrictions placed on women by many Christian churches stem from two passages: 1  Timothy 2:12 and 1 Corinthians (specifically ). The book presents Kroeger's view of the issues and problems Paul was addressing, along the author's understanding of Greek word usage, the Roman/Greek customs and laws of the day, and the outside influences on the Christian churches of the 1st Century. While holding firm to an authoritative approach to the biblical text, the Kroegers' research argued from the background of 1 Timothy 2:12 changes in the Greek language since the 1st century, Roman empire customs at the time the Apostle Paul wrote 1 Timothy, the problems that the church in Ephesus was facing with pagan religions that, according to the Kroegers' thesis, gnosticism was taking hold of the Christians at Ephesus, and the women were more prone to be misled by gnostic beliefs and then try to pass on those erroneous beliefs.

Kroeger was however frequently found by other academics as providing untrustworthy academic material for use by other authors in an academic sense.

Publications
She authored, co-authored or edited thirteen books, including The IVP Women's Bible Commentary.

Study Bible for Women, (Oxford University Press, Refugio del Abuso: Sandidad y Esperanza Para Mujeres Abusadas (with Nancy Nason-Clark; Grace Nelson, 2005)
Refuge From Abuse: Hope and Healing for the Abused Christian Woman (with Nancy Nason-Clark; InterVarsity Press, 2004); Also available in Portuguese
IVPress Women’s Bible Commentary, (Downers Grove, 2002)
No Place for Abuse: Biblical and Practical Resources to Counteract Domestic Violence (with Nancy Nason-Clark; InterVarsity Press, 2001, 2010)
Healing the Hurting: Giving Hope and Help to Abused Women (with James R. Beck; Baker Books, 1998)
Women, Abuse, and the Bible: How Scripture Can Be Used to Hurt or to Heal (with James R. Beck; Baker Books, 1996)
The Goddess Revival, cowritten with Aida Besançon Spencer, Donna F. G. Hailson and William David Spencer (Baker, 1995) The Goddess Revival was a 1996 Christianity Today Book Award winner
I Suffer Not a Woman: Rethinking 1 Timothy 2:11-15 in Light of Ancient Evidence (with Richard Clark Kroeger; Baker Book House, 1992)
NRSV Study Bible for Women New Testament, co-authored with Elaine Storkey and Mary Evans (Baker Books, 1985)
"Does Belief in Women’s Equality Lead to an Acceptance of Homosexual Practice?" Priscilla Papers, Spring 2004
"Pandemonium and Silence at Corinth" (with Richard Kroeger),The Reformed Journal, June 1978
The Women's Study Bible (ed.) Oxford University Press, USA (September 15, 2009) 0195291255
''Beyond Abuse in the Christian Home: Raising Voices for Change" (ed.), Nancy Nason-Clark & Barbara Fisher-Townsend. Wipf & Stock, 2008. 978-1556350863

References

1925 births
2011 deaths
Writers from Saint Paul, Minnesota
University of Minnesota College of Liberal Arts alumni
Christian writers
American Presbyterians
19th-century American women writers
21st-century American women